Lee Soo-Chul (Hangul: 이수철; Hanja: 李壽澈; May 20, 1966 – October 18, 2011) was a South Korean footballer and football manager.

He played for Ulsan Hyundai FC as a forward, and was manager of Sangju Sangmu Phoenix at the time of his death.

Lee was found dead on October 18, 2011, in an apparent suicide.  He was 45.

References 

1966 births
2011 suicides
Ulsan Hyundai FC players
Gimcheon Sangmu FC managers
South Korean footballers
Association footballers not categorized by position
South Korean football managers
Suicides in South Korea